Alexandra Silva (born 1984) is a Portuguese computer scientist and Professor at Cornell University. She was previously Professor of Algebra, Semantics, and Computation at University College London.

Awards and honours 
Silva won a Philip Leverhulme Prize in engineering in 2016. She won the Presburger Award, awarded each year to "a young scientist for outstanding contributions in theoretical computer science, documented by a published paper or a series of published papers", in 2017, and the Roger Needham Award in 2018.

References 

1984 births
Living people
Portuguese computer scientists
Portuguese women computer scientists
Women logicians
University of Minho alumni